Madonna and Child is a 1504-1507 oil on panel painting by Cima da Conegliano, now in the Louvre, in Paris.

Variants
The artist usually produced unique compositions, but this work belongs to a group of at least five paintings produced from the same cartoon:

References

1490s paintings
Paris
Paintings in the Louvre by Italian artists